Gestaclone (INN, USAN) (developmental code name SH-1040), also known as 6-chloro-1α,2α:16α,17-bismethylene-4,6-pregnadiene-3,20-dione, is a steroidal progestin of unique chemical structure derived from progesterone that was first described in 1967 and was never marketed.

References

Diketones
Organochlorides
Pregnanes
Progestogens
Cyclopropanes